Ezrat Torah (in Ashkenazi Hebrew pronunciation: Ezras Torah)  is a Haredi neighborhood in northern Jerusalem. It is bordered by Kiryat Sanz on the west, Golda Meir Blvd. on the north and east, and Shikun Chabad and Tel Arza on the south.

History
Founded around 1970, Ezrat Torah is named for the Ezras Torah Fund, a Jewish American charitable organization.

Rabbinic presence
Rabbi Yechiel Michel Stern, the author of 84 published Torah works who is considered an expert on the halakhot of the Four Species, has served as the Rav of Ezrat Torah since the 1970s. The Kapishnitzer Rebbe, Rabbi Yitzchak Meir Palintenstein, brought his Hasidut here in 1975. Other rabbis who live here include:
Rabbi Shmuel Rabinovitch, Rabbi of the Western Wall and the Holy Sites of Israel
Rabbi Avraham Garbuz, author of the sefer Minchas Avraham on Kodashim
Rabbi Shalom Schechter, Rosh Yeshiva of Yeshivat Ner Moshe
Rabbi Yitzchok Dov Shechter, Rosh Yeshiva of Rabbi Mitnik's yeshiva

Landmarks
Yeshivas Kodshim (Rav Tzvi Kaplan's Yeshiva)
Beis Yisrael social hall
Original site of Yeshiva Ohr Elchonon founded by Rabbi Simcha Wasserman
Yeshiva Gedolah Yagdil Torah
Rachmastrivka Yeshiva

References

Neighbourhoods of Jerusalem
Haredi Judaism in Jerusalem